Merrick or Merick is a surname. Notable people with the surname include:

Arts and entertainment
 Bryn Merrick (born 1958), British guitarist with The Damned
 David Merrick (1911–2000), American theatre producer
 Doris Merrick (1919–2019), American actress
 Elizabeth Merrick (born c. 1973), American writer and publisher
 Frank Merrick (1886–1981), English pianist
 Gordon Merrick (1916–1988), gay American writer and actor
 Jerry Merrick, American singer-songwriter
 James Merrick (1720–1769), English poet
 Linda Merrick (born 1963), British clarinettist
 Lynn Merrick (1919–2007), American actress
 Sarah Newcomb Merrick (1844–?), Canadian-American teacher, writer, businessperson, physician, inventor
 Thom Merrick (born 1963), American artist
 Will Merrick (born 1993), English screen and stage actor
 Zack Merrick (born 1988), bassist in the band All Time Low

Business  
 George E. Merrick (1886–1942), real estate developer of Coral Gables, Florida
 John Merrick (insurance) (1859–1919), African-American founder of North Carolina Mutual & Provident Insurance Company
 Samuel Vaughan Merrick (1801–1870), American manufacturer

Politics and governance
 Ben Merrick, Director of Overseas Territories in the UK Foreign and Commonwealth Office
 Henry Merrick (1837–?), Canadian politician
 John Merrick (fl. ca. 1596–1621), English ambassador to Russia
 Raymond Merrick (born 1939), member of the Kansas senate
 Scott Merrick (born 1985), member of New Hampshire House of Representatives
 William Duhurst Merrick (1793–1857), US senator from Maryland
 William Matthew Merrick (1818–1889), United States Circuit Court judge and congressman from Maryland
 John Merrick (MP) (1584–1659), politician and soldier

Sports
 Alan Merrick (born 1950), English association football player who played in the USA
 Bob Merrick (1893–1981), Australian rules footballer
 Ed Merrick, American football coach of the University of Richmond Spiders
 Ernie Merrick (born 1953), Scottish association football manager
 Gil Merrick (1922–2010), English association football goalkeeper and manager
 John Merrick (golfer) (b.orn 1982), American golfer
 Wayne Merrick (born 1952), Canadian ice hockey player
 Merrick Elderton (1884–1939), English cricketer

Other
 A. W. Merrick (1840–1902), American journalist
 Anne Morrissy Merick (1933–2017), pioneering American journalist
 Christene Merick (1916–2008), American philanthropist
 Joseph Merrick (1862–1890), English man with severe deformities known as the "Elephant Man"
 Joseph Merrick (missionary) (1808–1849), Jamaican missionary to Cameroon
 Mary Virginia Merrick (1866–1955), American social reformer
 Richard T. Merrick (1828–1885), American lawyer
 Suds Merrick (died 1884), New York criminal

English-language surnames
Welsh-language surnames